The Military ranks of Lesotho are the military insignia used by the Lesotho Defence Force. Being a Landlocked country, Lesotho does not have a navy.

Commissioned officer ranks
The rank insignia of commissioned officers.

Other ranks
The rank insignia of non-commissioned officers and enlisted personnel.

References

External links
 

Lesotho
Military of Lesotho